Mar Emmanuel Yosip (born Emmanuel Rehana Yosip) is a Bishop of the Assyrian Church of the East, presiding over the Diocese of Canada.

Early life 
Emmanuel Rehana Yosip was born in 1958 in Dora, Baghdad, Iraq to a devout Christian family. He subsequently moved to the United States where he was ordained a deacon in 1981, and a priest in 1984 at Mar Gewargis Cathedral (St. George Cathedral) in Chicago, Illinois.

Education 
Mar Emmanuel obtained his PhD in Syriac studies from the University of Toronto in 2015. His doctoral dissertation is titled The Book of Resh Melle by Yohannan Bar Penkaye: An Introduction to the Text and Study of its Literary Genres. He also holds a master's degree in Near and Middle Eastern civilizations from the same university, as well as a Master of Divinity.

Tenure as Bishop 
On 3 June 1990, Emmanuel Rehana Yosip was consecrated as Bishop of Canada by Mar Dinkha IV, taking the name Mar Emmanuel Yosip.

Advocacy 
As Bishop, Mar Emmanuel has been an activist in the awareness of the plight of the persecuted Christians of the Middle East. On 9 December 2014, he spoke with The Standing Committee on Foreign Affairs and International Development in a meeting on "Canada's Response to the Violence, Religious Persecution and Dislocation Caused by the Islamic State of Iraq and the Levant (ISIL)".

Diocese of Canada

Parishes 
Mart Mariam (St. Mary) Cathedral - Toronto, Ontario
Mar Mari (St. Mari) Parish - Hamilton, Ontario
Mar Toma (St. Thomas) Parish - Windsor, Ontario
Mar Zaia (St. Zayya) Parish - London, Ontario

See also
Assyrian Church of the East

References

20th-century bishops of the Assyrian Church of the East
Iraqi Assyrian people
University of Toronto alumni
1958 births
Living people
People from Baghdad
Iraqi Christians
Iraqi emigrants to the United States
Iraqi emigrants to Canada
Syriac writers
21st-century bishops of the Assyrian Church of the East